The A J  Moir Stakes is a Moonee Valley Racing Club Group 1 Thoroughbred horse race for horses aged three years old and over under Weight for age conditions, over a distance of 1000 metres, held at Moonee Valley Racecourse, Melbourne, Australia in late September. Prizemoney is A$1,000,000.

History
The A J Moir Stakes was named after former Chairman of the Moonee Valley Racing Club (1960-75), long standing committeeman and prominent Melbourne solicitor Alan John Moir KCMG (1903–81) of the Melbourne establishment firm Gillott, Moir and Winneke - now MinterEllison.
As a prominent lawyer and company Director he held various other positions including; President of the Victorian Law Institute (1939-40), Director and Chairman of GTV 9 and Director of David Syme and Co Limited (the Age)  where he played an important role in the formation of Syme as a public company in 1948. 
He received a CMG (Companion title Order of Saint Michael and Saint George) title in 1971 for his services to the racing industry. 

Alan John Moir was also a great grandson of former Victorian Premier, Sir Graham Berry and relative to Mr Henry Albert Underwood, of the Underwood racing family. 

The AJ Moir Stakes was first run in 1976 and won by Scamanda.

Elevated to Group 2 status in 1979, it has been won by many star sprinters, most notably Manikato, who became the second horse to pass $1 million in earnings when he won in 1982. Other top-line winners include the Judge (1978–79) and his sister Victoria Peak (1980), Special (1986), Placid Ark (1987), Spartacus (1996), Falvelon (2000), Spinning Hill (2002) and more recently Miss Andretti, Apache Cat and Black Caviar.

For the 2013 running of the event the race was upgraded to Group 1 status and moved from the traditional Cox Plate Day card to be run under lights on Friday night before the AFL Grand Final.

Distance
 1976–2006 - 1000 metres
 2007–2014 - 1200 metres
 2015 onwards - 1000 metres

Grade
 1976–1978 - Principal race
 1979–2012 - Group 2 
 2013 onwards - Group 1

Name
 1976–1995 - A.J. Moir Stakes
 1996–2002 - Schweppes Stakes
 2003–2006 - Schweppervescence Stakes
 2006–2011 - Schweppes Stakes
 2012 onwards - A.J. Moir Stakes

Records

Most successful horse (3 wins):
Buffering (2012, 2014, 2015)

Leading jockey (4 wins):
Damien Oliver – Schillaci (1992), Magic Music (1999), Falvelon (2000), Apache Cat (2009)

Leading trainer (4 wins):
Angus Armanasco  – Tetranate (1977), The Judge (1978, 1979), Victoria Peak (1980)
Bruce McLachlan – With Me (1990, 1991), Al Mansour (1997), Virage De Fortune (2005)

Winners

 2022 - Coolangatta
 2021 - Wild Ruler
 2020 - Pippie
 2019 - Nature Strip
 2018 - Viddora
 2017 - She Will Reign
 2016 - Extreme Choice
 2015 - Buffering
 2014 - Buffering
 2013 - Samaready
 2012 - Buffering
 2011 - Black Caviar
 2010 - Black Caviar
 2009 - Apache Cat
 2008 - Lucky Secret
 2007 - Miss Andretti
 2006 - California Dane
 2005 - Virage De Fortune
 2004 - Bomber Bill
 2003 - Our Egyptian Raine
 2002 - Spinning Hill
 2001 - Mistegic
 2000 - Falvelon
 1999 - Magic Music
 1998 - Show No Emotion
 1997 - Al Mansour
 1996 - Spartacus
 1995 - Quality Gold
 1994 - Sequalo
 1993 - Sports Works
 1992 - Schillaci
 1991 - With Me
 1990 - With Me
 1989 - †Good Old Ted / Clay Hero
 1988 - Scarlet Bisque
 1987 - Placid Ark
 1986 - Special
 1985 - Aquilone
 1984 - Foystaan
 1983 - Bold Jet
 1982 - Manikato
 1981 - Bold Prospect
 1980 - Victoria Peak
 1979 - †The Judge / Grey Sapphire 
 1978 - The Judge
 1977 - Tetranate
 1976 - Scamanda

† Dead heat

See also
 List of Australian Group races
 Group races

References

Open sprint category horse races
Group 1 stakes races in Australia